The 2006–07 New Zealand Figure Skating Championships was held at the Paradice in Botany Downs, Auckland from 18 through 22 September 2006. Skaters competed in the disciplines of men's singles, ladies' singles, and synchronized skating across many levels, including senior, junior, novice, adult, and the pre-novice disciplines of juvenile, pre-primary, primary, and intermediate.

Senior results

Men

Ladies

Synchronized

External links
 2006–07 New Zealand Figure Skating Championships results

2006 in figure skating
New Zealand Figure Skating Championships
Figure Skating
September 2006 sports events in New Zealand